The following is a list of causes of hypoglycemia

Newborns
Hypoglycemia is a common problem with an increasing incidence in critically ill or extremely low birthweight infants. Its potential association with brain damage and neurodevelopment delay make it an important topic. If not due to maternal hyperglycemia, in most cases it is multifactorial, transient and easily supported. In a minority of cases, hypoglycemia turns out to be due to significant hyperinsulinism, hypopituitarism or an inborn error of metabolism and presents more of a management challenge.
 Transient neonatal hypoglycemia
 Prematurity, intrauterine growth retardation, perinatal asphyxia
 Maternal hyperglycemia due to diabetes or iatrogenic glucose administration
 Sepsis
 Prolonged fasting (e.g., due to inadequate breast milk or condition interfering with feeding)
 Congenital hypopituitarism
 Congenital hyperinsulinism, several types, both transient and persistent
 Inborn errors of carbohydrate metabolism such as glycogen storage disease

Young children
Single episodes of hypoglycemia may occur due to gastroenteritis or fasting, but recurrent episodes nearly always indicate either an inborn error of metabolism, congenital hypopituitarism, or congenital hyperinsulinism.  A list of common causes:
 Prolonged fasting
 Diarrheal illness in young children, especially rotavirus gastroenteritis
 Idiopathic ketotic hypoglycemia
 Isolated growth hormone deficiency, hypopituitarism
 Insulin excess
 Hyperinsulinism due to several congenital disorders of insulin secretion
 Insulin injected for type 1 diabetes
 Hyperinsulinism-hyperammonemia syndrome (HIHA) due to glutamate dehydrogenase 1 gene. Can cause intellectual disability and epilepsy in severe cases.
 Gastric dumping syndrome (after gastrointestinal surgery)
 Other congenital metabolic diseases; some of the common include
 Maple syrup urine disease and other organic acidurias
 Type 1 glycogen storage disease
 Type III glycogen storage disease. Can cause less severe hypoglycemia than type I
 Phosphoenolpyruvate carboxykinase deficiency, causes metabolic acidosis and severe hypoglycemia.
 Disorders of fatty acid oxidation
 Medium chain acylCoA dehydrogenase deficiency (MCAD)
 Familial Leucine sensitive hypoglycemia
 Accidental ingestions including pharmacy misfills
 Sulfonylureas, propranolol and others
 Ethanol (mouthwash, alcoholic beverages)

Young adults
By far, the most common cause of severe hypoglycemia in this age range is insulin injected for type 1 diabetes. Circumstances should provide clues fairly quickly for the new diseases causing severe hypoglycemia. All of the congenital metabolic defects, congenital forms of hyperinsulinism, and congenital hypopituitarism are likely to have already been diagnosed or are unlikely to start causing new hypoglycemia at this age. Body mass is large enough to make starvation hypoglycemia and idiopathic ketotic hypoglycemia quite uncommon. Recurrent mild hypoglycemia may fit a reactive hypoglycemia pattern, but this is also the peak age for idiopathic postprandial syndrome, and recurrent "spells" in this age group can be traced to orthostatic hypotension or hyperventilation as often as demonstrable hypoglycemia.
 Insulin-induced hypoglycemia
 Insulin injected for type 1 diabetes
 Factitious insulin injection (Munchausen syndrome)
 Insulin-secreting pancreatic tumor (Insulinoma)
 Reactive hypoglycemia and idiopathic postprandial syndrome
 Addison's disease
 Sepsis
 Adams Disease

Older adults
The incidence of hypoglycemia due to complex drug interactions, especially involving oral hypoglycemic agents and insulin for diabetes, rises with age. Though much rarer, the incidence of insulin-producing tumors also rises with advancing age. Most tumors causing hypoglycemia by mechanisms other than insulin excess occur in adults.
 Insulin-induced hypoglycemia
 Insulin injected for diabetes
 Factitious insulin injection (Munchausen syndrome)
 Excessive effects of oral Anti-diabetic medication, beta-blockers, or drug interactions
 Insulin-secreting neuroendocrine tumor (insulinoma) of the pancreas
 Alcohol induced hypoglycemia often linked with ketoacidosis (depletion of NAD+ leads to a block of gluconeogenesis)
 Alimentary (rapid jejunal emptying with exaggerated insulin response)
 After gastrectomy dumping syndrome or bowel bypass surgery or resection
 Reactive hypoglycemia and Idiopathic postprandial syndrome
 Tumor hypoglycemia, Doege-Potter syndrome
 Acquired adrenal insufficiency
 Acquired hypopituitarism
 Immunopathologic hypoglycemia

Causes by organ system

Alphabetical order

 1,1-Dichloroethene
 2-methylbutyryl-coenzyme A dehydrogenase deficiency
 3-alpha-hydroxyacyl-CoA dehydrogenase deficiency
 3-Methylcrotonyl-CoA carboxylase deficiency
 ACAD9 deficiency
 Acetohexamide
 Ackee fruit
 Acute fatty liver of pregnancy
 Acute liver failure
 Acute meningitis
 Addison's disease
 Adrenal cancer
 Adrenal cortex insufficiency
 Adrenal insufficiency
 Alcoholism
 Alpers' syndrome
 Amprenavir
 Anorexia nervosa
 Autoimmune adrenalitis
 Autonomic dystonia
 Autonomic neuropathy
 Beginning stages of diabetes
 Benign glucosuria
 Binge drinking
 Bulimia nervosa
 Burns
 Cachexia
 Carbohydrate-deficient glycoprotein syndrome type 1b
 Carnitine palmitoyltransferase I deficiency
 Carnitine-acylcarnitine translocase deficiency
 Chloramphenicol
 Chlorpromazine
 Chlorpropamide
 Cibenzoline
 Cirrhosis
 Cleft lip palate pituitary deficiency
 Clove
 Coenzyme Q cytochrome c reductase deficiency
 Deficiency in enzymes of fat oxidation
 Delayed separation blood sample
 Diabetic gastroparesis
 Diabetic mother
 Diarrhea
 Dicarboxylicaminoaciduria
 Dihydrolipoamide dehydrogenase deficiency
 Doege-Potter syndrome
 Donohue syndrome
 Dopamine beta-hydroxylase deficiency
 Drip arm sample
 Dumping syndrome
 Elevated vagal tone
 Ethanol
 Ethionamide
 Familial glucocorticoid deficiency
 Familial hyperinsulinemic hypoglycemia type 3
 Familial hyperinsulinemic hypoglycemia type 5
 Familial hyperinsulinemic hypoglycemia type 7
 Fasting
 Fluorodeoxyglucose
 Fructose intolerance
 Fructose-1,6-diphosphatase deficiency
 Fructose-1-phosphate aldolase deficiency
 Functioning pancreatic endocrine tumor
 Galactose-1-phosphate uridyltransferase deficiency
 Galactosemia
 Gastric dumping syndrome
 Gastrojejunostomy
 Gatifloxacin
 Gestational diabetes
 Ginseng
 Glibenclamide
 Gliclazide
 Glimepiride
 Glipizide
 Gliquidone
 Glisolamide
 Glisoxepide
 Glucagon deficiency
 Glucose 6 phosphate dehydrogenase deficiency
 Glutaric acidemia type 2
 Glycogen debranching deficiency
 Glycogenosis type 1a
 Glycogenosis type 1b
 Glycogenosis type 3
 Glycogenosis type 6
 Glycogenosis type 9a
 Glycogenosis type 9b
 Glycogenosis type 9c
 Glycogenosis type V
 Growth hormone deficiency (congenital)
 Heavy exercise
 Hemolytic disease of the newborn
 Hepatic congestion
 Hepatic failure
 Hereditary ACTH resistance
 HMG-CoA lyase deficiency
 Hydroxymethylglutaryl-CoA lyase deficiency
 Hyperinsulinism-hyperammonemia syndrome
 Hypoketonemic hypoglycemia
 Hypopituitarism
 Hypothermia
 Hypothyroidism
 Idiopathic hypoglycemia
 Idiopathic postprandial syndrome
 IGF producing tumors
 Immunopathologic hypoglycemia
 Insulin
 Insulin-like growth factor
 Insulin receptor antibodies
 Insulinoma
 Intrauterine growth retardation
 Jamaican vomiting sickness
 Ketotic hypoglycemia of infancy
 Kidney Failure
 Lanreotide
 Laron dwarfism
 Leucine-induced hypoglycaemia
 Levomepromazine
 Liver cancer
 Liver glycogen synthase deficiency
 Long-chain hydroxyacyl-CoA dehydrogenase deficiency
 Malabsorption
 Malaria (malignant tertian)
 Maldigestion
 Malonyl-CoA decarboxylase deficiency
 Maple syrup urine disease
 Mcquarrie type infantile idiopathic hypoglycemia
 Medium chain acyl-CoA dehydrogenase deficiency
 Mesothelioma
 Methylmalonic acidemia
 Mitiglinide
 Mitochondrial DNA depletion syndrome, hepatocerebral form
 Mitochondrial trifunctional protein deficiency
 Multiple endocrine neoplasia
 Munchausen syndrome
 Myxedema coma
 Nateglinide
 Navajo neurohepatopathy
 Nephroblastomatosis-fetal ascites-macrosomia-wilms tumor
 Nesidioblastosis
 Organic acidemia
 Pazopanib
 Pentamidine
 Perazine
 Phosphoenolpyruvate carboxykinase (PEPCK) deficiency
 Pipothiazine
 Plasma membrane carnitine transporter deficiency
 Postgastrectomy syndrome
 Pramlintide
 Pregnancy
 Premature labour and/or delivery
 Propionyl-CoA carboxylase deficiency PCCA type
 Pyloroplasty
 Quinine
 Reactive hypoglycemia
 Renal hypoglycemia
 Repaglinide
 Reye syndrome
 Ritonavir
 Saquinavir
 Sepsis
 Septic shock
 Severe hepatitis
 Sheehan syndrome
 Short-chain acyl-CoA dehydrogenase deficiency
 Short stature-pituitary and cerebellar defects-small sella turcica
 Somatostatin
 Starvation (acute)
 Sulfamethoxazole
 Systemic monochloroacetate poisoning
 Temafloxacin
 Timme syndrome
 Tolazamide
 Tolbutamide
 Trimethoprim
 Triple A syndrome
 Tumors
 Tyrosinaemia type 1
 Urea cycle disorder
 Uremia
 Very-long-chain acyl-CoA dehydrogenase deficiency
 Visceral leishmaniasis
 Wiedemann-Beckwith syndrome
 X-linked congenital adrenal hypoplasia

References 

Disorders of endocrine pancreas
Medical emergencies